Chernovskaya is a rural locality (a village) in Chertkovskoye Rural Settlement, Selivanovsky District, Vladimir Oblast, Russia. The population was 17 as of 2010.

Geography 
Chernovskaya is located 19 km northeast of Krasnaya Gorbatka (the district's administrative centre) by road. Nadezhdino is the nearest rural locality.

References 

Rural localities in Selivanovsky District